Krishnapuram is a village in the Orathanadu taluk of Thanjavur district, Tamil Nadu, India.

Demographics 

As per the 2001 census, Krishnapuram had a total population of 895 with 459 males and 436 females. The sex ratio was 950. The literacy rate was 59.51.

References 

 

Villages in Thanjavur district